Bankipur is a name used for several locations:
 Bankipur (Bengal), a former Austrian settlement in Bengal by the Ganges.
 Bankipore, a neighborhood in Patna, Bihar, India.
 Bankipur Central Jail, a jail in Patna, Bihar, India.
 A village in Khejuri II, West Bengal, India, by the sea.
 Mirzapur-Bankipur railway station, part of the Kolkata Suburban Railway system.